Los Angeles Street, originally known as Calle de los Negros or Alley of the Black People, is a major thoroughfare in Downtown Los Angeles, California, dating back to the origins of the city as the Pueblo de Los Ángeles.

Location
The principal length of the street proceeds north from 23rd Street, past Interstate 10, through the Fashion District, past the western edge of Little Tokyo, past the Caltrans District Headquarters, the former Los Angeles Police Department Headquarters at Parker Center and the Los Angeles Mall (which contains City Hall East).

Los Angeles Street ends at Alameda Street, north of the US 101  near Olvera Street and Union Station.

In South Los Angeles there are two other portions of Los Angeles Street, one running from Slauson Avenue to 59th Place and another from 122nd Street to 124th Street near Willowbrook.

History
The block of Los Angeles Street that runs by the Old Plaza was originally known as "Calle de los Negros" or "Alley of the Black People". On late 19th century maps it is also marked with a contemporary English translation of that phrase, Nigger Alley. The Chinese massacre of 1871 took place on Los Angeles Street when it was still known as Calle de los Negros. The printing house for the city's first newspaper, Star of Los Angeles, was located on Los Angeles Street, which was known at the time as Calle Zanja Madre (Mother Ditch street).

Los Angeles Street was the easternmost street in the city's central business district during the 1880s and 1890s. Around Los Angeles and 3rd was the wholesale district, which over time moved further and further southeast into what is now the Fashion District and beyond.

Education
 Santee Education Complex

Landmarks from Plaza to 3rd Street

Landmarks in Historic Core: 3rd Street to Olympic

Corner of 5th St.
 Baltimore Hotel, opened 1910, architect Arthur Rowland Kelley 
 King Edward Hotel, opened 1906, architects Parkinson and Bergstrom

Corner of 9th St.
 Cooper Building, northeast corner, opened 1926, architects Curlett & Beelman. By the early 1980s the Cooper Building was already a key destination for retail shoppers looking for fashion bargains in the Los Angeles Fashion District.
 Gerry Building, southeast corner, opened 1947, Streamline Moderne architectural style

References

External links
"Calle de los Negros", KCET (Los Angeles Public Television)

External links

 Tourist map of Downtown L.A.

Streets in Los Angeles
Downtown Los Angeles